The 2017 Emir of Qatar Cup was the 45th edition of the cup tournament in men's football. It was played by the 1st and 2nd level divisions of the Qatari football league structure.

The competition featured all teams from the 2016–17 Qatar Stars League and the top four sides from the Qatargas League. Four venues were used – Al Sadd Stadium, Al Arabi Stadium,  Qatar SC Stadium and Khalifa Stadium.

The cup winner is guaranteed a place in the 2018 AFC Champions League.

Round one

Round two

Round three

Quarter finals

Semi finals

Final

References

External links
2017 Emir Cup, Soccerway.com

Football competitions in Qatar
Football cup competitions in Qatar